Ahmad Hindi (born 29 November 1995) is a Jordanian Paralympic athlete. He won the gold medal in the men's shot put F34 event at the 2020 Summer Paralympics held in Tokyo, Japan. He also won the gold medal in the men's shot put F34 event at the 2019 World Para Athletics Championships held in Dubai, United Arab Emirates.

References

External links
 

Living people
1995 births
Sportspeople from Amman
Jordanian male shot putters
Athletes (track and field) at the 2020 Summer Paralympics
Medalists at the 2020 Summer Paralympics
Paralympic gold medalists for Jordan
Paralympic medalists in athletics (track and field)
Paralympic athletes of Jordan
World Para Athletics Championships winners
Arab people of Indian descent